All Terrain Walkers are armoured fighting vehicles from the Star Wars universe that traverse the landscape on mechanical legs. They are used by the Old Republic, the Galactic Empire, and the First Order for ground assault, reconnaissance or transport. Throughout the saga walkers have played a pivotal role in the fate of characters and the outcome of battles. Industrial Light and Magic (ILM) is responsible for their animation and design, often using models, stop-motion animation, and relevant matte paintings to depict their presence in the films.

There are a variety of walkers: The Empire Strikes Back and Return of the Jedi introduced the All Terrain Armored Transport (AT-AT) and All Terrain Scout Transport (AT-ST).  Star Wars: Episode II – Attack of the Clones, Star Wars: Episode III – Revenge of the Sith and The Clone Wars introduced earlier Clone Wars-era models of walkers, such as the All-Terrain Tactical Enforcer (AT-TE), and the All Terrain Recon Transports (AT-RT). The Star Wars Legends continuity features numerous walker variants, several which have been merchandised in popular culture, while the later films Rogue One and Star Wars: The Last Jedi depicted, respectively, the former the AT-ACT variant to the standard AT-AT, the latter a restyled AT-AT for its new and more modern setting, and a new, even larger walker known as the AT-M6.

All Terrain Armored Transport (AT-AT)

The All Terrain Armored Transport is a quadruped mechanized infantry combat vehicle used by Imperial ground forces.

The AT-AT (pronounced either casually as 'at at', or using only the letters '') was first introduced in The Empire Strikes Back (as the Galactic Empire's main units against Rebel Alliance infantry during the Battle of Hoth) and also appears in Return of the Jedi and in Rogue One (in the AT-ACT variant). 

The  also appears in a destroyed form in Star Wars: The Force Awakens, explained in the video game Star Wars Battlefront (2015) to be a residue of the Battle of Jakku, which was the Empire's last defeat and resulted in its dissolution. Modified forms appear in The Last Jedi (used by the First Order to attack Resistance forces in a former Rebel base).

The theme park attraction Star Wars: Rise of the Resistance, set after The Last Jedi, features two full-sized AT-ATs in a hangar bay. These walkers, while mostly static, can move their cannons to allow for a scene in which the walker's drivers spot the ride vehicles and fire at them.

Origin and design
Joe Johnston's original design for the Empire's war machines was a giant, multi-wheeled vehicle; this design later became the "Juggernaut" in West End Games' roleplaying material, and the design was reworked into the clone turbo tank for Star Wars: Episode III – Revenge of the Sith. Johnston said Lucas wanted the walkers to look like anthropomorphic walking tanks to make them frightening.

For The Empire Strikes Back, however, the final design was a four-legged walker. Inspiration for the  came from Paraceratherium, an extinct genus of rhinoceros and the largest land mammal in history. George Lucas later dismissed claims that the  design was inspired by container cranes at the Port of Oakland (across San Francisco Bay from ILM's San Rafael offices), calling it a "myth"; animator Phil Tippett told the San Francisco Chronicle the same thing.

ILM filmed the  using stop-motion animation against matte paintings created by Michael Pangrazio because attempts at compositing miniature footage against live-action background footage yielded mediocre results. Additionally, ILM studied elephants to determine the best way to animate the four-legged . Although the stop-motion animation style gave the  a jerky, "staccato-like" effect on film, ILM found this movement acceptable because of the  mechanical nature.

The sound of the AT-AT walking was created by sound designer Ben Burtt using a punch press.

Depiction
The All Terrain Armored Transport is an assault walker used by Imperial ground forces to blast through enemy lines with its sheer mass and firepower and deploy a platoon of crack assault troops. The thick armor plating on the AT-AT will deflect or absorb anything but the heaviest turbolaser weaponry. Its prodigious height also helps the walker see over obstacles and provides a clear line of sight for its weaponry, carried in its heavily armored head. A pair of Class II heavy laser cannons mounted in the head's "chin" can be fired in quick succession or simultaneously for a single, power blast, and can engage targets from many kilometers away; on either side of the "temples" are mounted medium repeating blasters and targeting rangefinders. When it comes time to deploy, troops carried in the  exit out of the sides via harness-and-cable from extendable boom racks while speeder bikes exit out the front and back using harnesses.

The walker's crew consists of two  pilots and a vehicle commander; while both pilots are fully qualified, one usually serves as the driver and the other as gunner.   pilots receive specialized training in order to operate their walkers, using terrain sensors in the head and footpads to find sure footing, and as such warrant extra layers of protection and long-lasting power packs in their life-support suits.

Although imposing, these weapons of terror have a number of design flaws. While AT-ATs can navigate most rugged ground, certain features such as steep hillsides or swamps can impede them.  A high center of gravity and unstable legs also make them susceptible to tripping. Their size makes them conspicuous targets, especially on open terrain; while largely impervious to attack, their neck and underbelly are vulnerable to blasters and missiles.

During the battle, the AT-AT designated Blizzard 2 is destroyed when Wedge Antilles and Wes Janson use their snowspeeder's tow cable to trip it up and target its now-exposed neck with blaster fire to blow it up. Luke Skywalker destroys another AT-AT, Blizzard 4, by using a magnetic grapple to reach its underbelly, cut open a hole with his lightsaber and throw in a grenade. Ultimately the Empire is victorious as General Veer's Blizzard 1 destroys the shield generator, and in the ensuing rout he orders the remaining AT-ATs and AT-STs to overrun the Rebels' trenches and capture as many as possible.

A ruined  appears in Star Wars: The Force Awakens as the makeshift home of the scavenger Rey on the planet Jakku.  Using scavenged parts from the walker and other vehicles, Rey is able to construct a power system for her home along with booby traps and motion sensors to deter potential thieves.  Information in the AT-AT's manifest reveal it was designated Hellhound 2, part of the complement of the Star Destroyer Interrogator, but the ultimate fate of its crew is unknown.

The First Order uses an updated model of the AT-AT during the Battle of Crait at the end of Star Wars: The Last Jedi. Built by Kuat-Entralla Drive Yards, these versions of the venerable AT-AT address some of the stability issues that plagued the Imperial walkers. They also use lighter armor material to add additional layers of protection and address weak points without increasing weight.

Analysis
In 2011, a fan-led effort to get a life-sized, fully functional AT-AT built was stopped by Lucasfilm as violating their intellectual property.  Commenting on the effort, Heiko Hoffman, a robotics expert at HRL Laboratories, argued that building an AT-AT would easily cost US$100 million or more.  He also argued that building such a vehicle would poses challenges since structural strength does not increase the same way as mass and there would be tremendous stress on the legs and joints, though he noted the AT-AT's method of walking was "statically stable" and appropriate for a heavy vehicle.  A later estimate conducted in 2016 argued that building a real-life AT-AT would cost US$228.5 million.  Using the M1 Abrams as a starting point, such a vehicle would weigh over 1,000 tons and generate 19 megawatts of power.

Dr. Malcolm Davis, director of the Defense & Strategy Program at the Australian Strategic Policy Institute, argues that the AT-AT has several flaws which make it an ineffective design.  Compared to tracked vehicles, Davis states that while walking vehicles like the AT-AT can potentially step over obstacles, they cannot run as fast, and destroying a leg would topple one over.  The AT-AT also has a limited field of fire with all its weapons mounted in the head and its slab sides would be more vulnerable to shaped charge munitions as opposed to angled sides.  He notes however that its height would give its line-of-sight weaponry a greater reach and puts its occupants well above any IED explosion.

Joe Pappalardo of Popular Mechanics also argues that the AT-AT is a poorly-designed troop transport, being slow, top-heavy and conspicuous with its legs being a particular vulnerability.  He contends that the Empire would have won the Battle of Hoth faster and more easily if they had deployed smaller conventional vehicles.

All Terrain Scout Transport (AT-ST)

The All Terrain Scout Transport (AT-ST) is a two-legged mech walker introduced briefly in The Empire Strikes Back and featured extensively in Return of the Jedi. These vehicles were designed to screen and protect the flanks of slower moving AT-ATs and the larger tanks used by the Empire. Due to their design and movement, they are often dubbed as a "chicken walker". This name was used for the official toy instead of the  name. Used in the battle of Endor and also used in the battle of Hoth.

An AT-ST also appears briefly in Rogue One: A Star Wars Story, patrolling Jedha City following an attack by Saw Gerrera's forces.  A modified AT-ST later appears in The Mandalorian under the possession of a group of raiders, as the Empire has ceased to exist by the time of the series.  An updated model of the AT-ST is used by the First Order in The Last Jedi. Shortly before the film's climax, an AT-ST is commandeered by BB-8.

Video games such as Star Wars: Rogue Squadron and Shadows of the Empire (in a much expanded Battle of Hoth) include numerous , and these can be destroyed by direct shooting from the player's craft, in contrast to the heavily armored  which have to be tripped by tow cables.  are also player-controllable units in several real-time strategy games.

Origin and design
A single AT-ST makes a brief appearance in The Empire Strikes Back alongside the larger  during the Battle of Hoth. The  was meant to have more screen time; however, one scene depicting a snowspeeder shooting at the  model was ruined when the set's background shifted.

For Return of the Jedi, ILM made the  design more detailed. Numerous models were created, including a full-sized  for on-location shooting. Director Richard Marquand and producer Robert Watts had cameos as  operators for the scene in which Chewbacca (Peter Mayhew) and a pair of Ewoks commandeer an AT-ST.

Lee Seiler sued Lucasfilm in the mid-1980s, claiming that the  infringed on his copyright on what he called a "Garthian Strider", which he said he created in 1976 or 1977. The case was dismissed with the court noting that not only did Seiler not produce the supposed drawings at trial, but that the copyright came one year after The Empire Strikes Back debuted.

Depiction
Constructed as a companion to the larger AT-AT, the scout walker's lightweight bipedal design allows it to travel across rugged ground and fulfill a variety of missions, including patrolling, reconnaissance and mop-up operations. Standard weaponry includes a chin-mounted twin medium blaster cannon, with a twin light blaster cannon and a concussion grenade launcher on either side of the head. AT-STs may carry different side-mounted weapons, such as a light blaster cannon and/or concussion missile launcher.

 are crewed by two pilots, one who controls the weaponry while the other drives the walker.  Their uniforms include fire-resistant boots, jumpsuits over basic armor plating, and crew helmets with attached telemetry receiver units.  The two operate the scout walker looking out of the forward viewports or by relying on viewscreens and holoprojectors which help them see the area all around the walker.  While the  computer can pilot it easily enough over level ground,  pilots must use their dexterity and superior sense of balance to help it navigate more difficult terrain.

Lightweight armor plating is proof against blasters and other small arms, but cannot withstand heavier laser cannons and missiles. The  must rely on high-intensity power cells as it is too small to carry a full power generator, limiting its range.

In The Empire Strikes Back,  scout for and provide support for the slower  during the Battle of Hoth; when the shield generator is destroyed, they race ahead of the assault walkers to capture as many of the fleeing Rebels as possible.  During the ground skirmish of the Battle of Endor in Return of the Jedi, after initially inflicting heavy casualties on the Rebels and Ewoks, several  are destroyed when they prove highly vulnerable to the Ewoks' primitive booby traps, with one crushed between two large tree trunks swung on ropes.  Another is hijacked thanks to Chewbacca climbing aboard and using his strength to rip open its roof hatch; he proceeds to turn its weapons against the other  to help win the battle.

An updated model of the AT-ST is used by the First Order during the Battle of Crait in The Last Jedi.  Based on the classic Imperial scout walker, this version boasts improved stability and greater protection thanks to new lightweight armor plating.

Analysis
In episode 208 of Mythbusters, the Build Team (Grant Imahara, Kari Byron and Tory Belleci) tested the plausibility of the scene in Return of the Jedi wherein a swinging log trap destroyed an AT-ST. To test this in real life, the team created a swinging log rig out of telephone poles and, after shoring the structure up with steel reinforcement, swung replica logs at an armored truck. The team declared the myth plausible when the logs succeeded in punching the truck's side panels off its frame.

All Terrain Tactical Enforcer (AT-TE)

The All Terrain Tactical Enforcer, or  walker, is a mechanized infantry combat vehicle used by the Grand Army of the Republic ground forces. Having six grappling legs and a low centre of gravity, this armoured walker could navigate any terrain – even climbing vertical cliffs. It appears in Attack of the Clones, Revenge of the Sith, The Clone Wars multimedia campaign, Star Wars Battlefront II and in the early episodes from the second season of Star Wars Rebels.

Origin and design

Depiction
 first appeared in Attack of the Clones during the Battle of Geonosis, where they serve as both assault vehicles and infantry transports for the Grand Army of the Republic.  Their in-universe manufacturer is Rothana Heavy Engineering, a subsidiary of Kuat Drive Yards and long-time enemy to the Trade Federation and Techno Union. A total of 2,160  were deployed in the battle, airlifted across the battlefield by special LAAT/c carriers to engage Separatist forces.

The walker's unique six-legged design and flexible midsection gives it excellent stability and allows it to traverse otherwise impassible terrain. Its footpads contain terrain sensors and tractor-field generators which enhance its purchase on rough ground.

A turret-mounted mass driver cannon atop the  has a low rate of fire but can be used to bombard fixed emplacements or shoot down slow-moving aircraft.  Six turret-mounted laser cannons, four on the front of the hull and two in the rear, defend it against enemy infantry.  The 's conductive armor spreads heat to minimize penetration from enemy fire, and is well-shielded against electromagnetic pulse and ion cannon weapons.

The  carries two squads of clone troopers into battle, with seating split between the front and rear sections of the walker.  These are connected by a flexible "concertina" section which also houses the walker's power generators. Inertial compensators beneath this seating helps to keep troopers secure, with seat restraints in case of compensator failure.

In the Star Wars Rebels second-season episode Relics of the Old Republic, a heavily customized  is used by clone troopers Rex, Wolffe and Gregor as a mobile residence on the planet Seelos.  Modifications made to the walker include renovating the interior to make room for bunk beds and a kitchen, and replacing the main cannon with rod and reel for catching the planet's wildlife.  During a confrontation with a group of Imperial AT-ATs, the clones'  is destroyed, but thanks to the crew of the Ghost the Imperials are defeated and a captured  is used to replace it.

Analysis
While acknowledging the  better stability and maneuverability, he cites the  more powerful weaponry, impenetrable armoring, and greater carrying capacity as making it the definitive Star Wars walker.

All Terrain MegaCaliber Six (AT-M6)

The All Terrain MegaCaliber Six, or  walker, is a mobile siege engine utilized by the First Order in their attempt to reconquer the galaxy.  Built around a massive turbolaser cannon carried on its back, this simian-shaped walker combins equal parts devastating firepower and psychological warfare.  These walkers made their theatrical appearance in The Last Jedi as the First Order attempted to wipe out the Resistance in the Battle of Crait, and have appeared in other multimedia related to the sequel trilogy. 

As part of a promotional tie-in for the release of The Last Jedi, Nissan unveiled a concept car based on the  called the Nissan Titan.  Weighing about 6,500 pounds and using primarily molded aluminum parts, the Titan was built in partnership with Vehicle Effects, which also built cars for the Fast & Furious and Marvel Cinematic Universe (MCU) franchises.  It was the most labor-intensive of several Star Wars-themed cars debuted in the run-up to the movie's release.

Origin and design
Kevin Jenkins, the movie's design supervisor, suggested to Rian Johnson that it be based on a gorilla instead of a dog so they could not be tripped up. Photos of real-life gorillas were used as a starting point for the final design and helped to give the  a distinctive and aggressive posture.

Depiction
Capable of penetrating deflector shields rated to withstand planetary bombardments, the weapon requires a dedicated power plant and several auxiliary fuel cells to reduce recharge time. The  heavily armored front legs were modified to handle the weight and massive recoil of firing the weapon, and feature ventilation gates which double as cable-cutters. This locomotion system also gives the walker the appearance of a giant simian predator which, combined with firepower to rival a battleship, is meant to help intimidate an opponent into submission.

Despite the Resistance's best efforts the walkers are able to hold them off and the superlaser punches a hole through their defenses. However, the arrival of Jedi Master Luke Skywalker distracts the First Order and allows the Resistance to successfully escape.

Analysis
A more realistic design he argues would look similarly to the massive tanks which feature in the Bolo universe. He argues it was a lost opportunity to not give the walker the same agility as its simian inspiration and allow it to use its massive arms to walk, climb and swing more easily over obstacles.

List of other Star Wars walkers
Many vehicles were created for various Star Wars media and depicted as technological evolutionary predecessors and successors to the walkers featured in the original trilogy.

In film and television 
Utilized by the Republic, Empire and First Order
All Terrain Attack Pod (AT-AP): Featured in Revenge of the Sith and Clone Wars media, as a variation of the AT-PT. Alex Jaeger designed the AT-AP per Lucas' request to "diversify the Clone armor". Nicknamed the "sniper tank", the AT-AP features a variety of artillery weapons, a retractable third leg for stability, and other offensive features.
All Terrain Open Transport (AT-OT): Introduced in Revenge of the Sith and other sources, is a heavily armored transport whose open design makes it vulnerable from above. The AT-OT can transport 34 clone troopers, who are protected by thick armor and four laser cannons. During the late stages of Revenge of the Sith's development, it was called the "Clone CAT walker".
All Terrain Recon Transports (AT-RT): Introduced in Revenge of the Sith operated by clone troopers searching for Yoda (Frank Oz) on Kashyyyk. The AT-RT is described as a precursor to the AT-ST, though it also shares similarities to the AT-PTs of the same era. A scene cut from Revenge of the Sith would have shown Yoda distracting clone troopers while Chewbacca removes them from their AT-RT in a manner similar to how he obtains control of an AT-ST in Return of the Jedi. AT-RT animators studied AT-ST movement to recreate part of the "original funkiness of movement" caused by the stop-animation style used in the original trilogy.
All Terrain Defense Pod (AT-DP): Introduced in Star Wars Rebels, the AT-DP is described by Star Wars references as a successor to the AT-RT, combining speed with an armored cockpit to protect a pilot and gunner. Because it is only armed with a single Kyuzo Maad-38 heavy laser cannon, the Empire primarily uses AT-DPs for defensive purposes like policing or sentry duty.
All Terrain Mobile Artillery (AT-MA): Introduced in The Force Awakens, the AT-MA is a model of quadruped base defense walker used by the First Order to defended Starkiller Base. While it resembled the All Terrain Armored Transport once used by the Galactic Empire in terms of size and weaponry, the AT-MA was primarily designed for defense, rather than transport or assault. Several of these walkers were deployed across the planet to protect its installations, and at least three of them were present during General Armitage Hux's speech before the destruction of the Hosnian system. Several AT-MAs were portrayed in the ground vehicles storage area of a Resurgent-class Star Destroyer.
All Terrain Armoured Cargo Transport (AT-ACT): Introduced in Rogue One, these walkers are slightly larger than the standard AT-AT, with a hollowed-out center section that can hold a cargo container. Director Gareth Edwards instructed the film's concept artists to design walkers based on their idealized memory of the AT-AT. According to background material, the AT-ACT was built for hauling cargo at Imperial construction sites and research facilities. Although not meant for use on the battlefield, the AT-ACT is heavily armored against most handheld weapons and equipped with two Taim & Bak MS-2 heavy laser cannons, allowing it to be deployed into combat in an emergency.
All Terrain Heavy Hauler (AT-HH): Featured in The Last Jedi, utilizing many more legs than most walkers to allow it to tow heavy cargo.
 All Terrain Heavy Scout (AT-HS): A model of walker fielded by the First Order. The LEGO version of the AT-HS was based on a piece of concept art for The Last Jedi which, although canon, was ultimately not used in the final cut of the film.
 All Terrain Cold-weather Mobile Heavy Cannon (AT-CMHC): A remodeled variant of the Umbaran UMHC used by the Imperial Military. This prototype model was specialized in sub-zero temperatures.

Utilized by other factions
 Umbaran mobile heavy cannon (UMHC): Used by Umbarans during the Clone Wars. Later, both the Imperial Army and Alliance to Restore the Republic used them during the Galactic Civil War. MHCs were heavily armored and had an articulated electromagnetic plasma cannon mounted on top of its dome-like body.

In Expanded Universe media 
All Terrain Personnel Transport (AT-PT): Introduced during the climax of Timothy Zahn's novel Dark Force Rising, is a two-legged, one-person vehicle designed for the Old Republic as a one man squad. These were designed to only fit one pilot, who gets in through a small side door. In an emergency, an extra person can be squeezed into the claustrophobic cockpit. This walker also had the interesting feature of having legs that can "crouch" when needed.The AT-PT is equipped with two blaster cannons, a concussion grenade launcher, and an array of sensors.The Empire would later end up finding and stealing these designs as the inspiration to the AT-AT and the AT-ST. The AT-PT is also featured in several video games, including Star Wars: Rogue Squadron, Star Wars: Force Commander, and Star Wars: Galactic Battlegrounds.
Mountain Terrain Armored Transport (MT-AT): Introduced in Jedi Academy Trilogy, dubbed "spider walkers", are octrupedalism specially for mountain terrain. These specific walkers can walk almost vertically, and are delivered through pods launched from larger ships
All Terrain Anti-Aircraft (AT-AA): Featured in various Expanded Universe media, is a four-legged anti-aircraft vehicle used by the Galactic Empire. The All Terrain Advance Raider (AT-AR) appears in Marvel Comics' Star Wars series and an All Terrain Experimental Transport (AT-XT) appears in LucasArts' Star Wars: The Clone Wars game. DK Publishing's Attack of the Clones: Incredible Cross-Sections book mentions an All Terrain Heavy Enforcer.

Merchandise
Kenner released AT-AT and AT-ST toys as part of their Empire Strikes Back line, and Hasbro released toys based on those molds when the Special Edition trilogy was distributed. Micro Machines also released AT-AT, AT-ST, and AT-TE toys. Both Decipher Inc. and Wizards of the Coast published AT-AT and AT-ST cards for their Star Wars Customizable Card Game and Star Wars Trading Card Game, respectively. Lego has released AT-AT, AT-ST, AT-DP, AT-AP, AT-OT, AT-RT, AT-TE, AT-M6, and AT-HS models.

See also
Mecha
Iron Dobbin, an early mechanical horse from 1933
Walking Truck, a real-world quadrupedal "walker" from 1969
BigDog, a dynamically stable quadruped military robot built in 2003

Bibliography

References

External links

 Index of Technology section of the Star Wars Databank – Includes several All Terrain walkers
 
 
 
 
 
 
 
 
 

Star Wars vehicles
Fictional mecha
Star Wars articles needing photos

es:AT-TE
it:AT-PT
sv:Lista över farkoster i Star Wars#AT-PT